The 1992 Junior League World Series took place from August 17–22 in Taylor, Michigan, United States. Tucson, Arizona defeated Lake Charles, Louisiana twice in the championship game.

Teams

Results

References

Junior League World Series
Junior League World Series
Junior